Ihor Ihorovych Bykovskyi (born 5 September 1996) is a Ukrainian professional footballer who plays as a right winger for Mariupol.

Career
Bykovskyi is a product of the Illichivets Mariupol academy.

He made his début for Illichivets Mariupol as a substituted player in a match against Vorskla Poltava in the Ukrainian Premier League on 16 May 2015.

References

External links
 
 
 

1996 births
Living people
Sportspeople from Mariupol
Ukrainian footballers
Association football forwards
FC Mariupol players
FC Shakhtar Donetsk players
FC Arsenal Kyiv players
FC Yarud Mariupol players
FC Lokomotiv Yerevan players
Ukrainian Premier League players
Ukrainian First League players
Ukrainian Second League players
Ukrainian Amateur Football Championship players
Armenian First League players
Ukrainian expatriate footballers
Expatriate footballers in Armenia
Ukrainian expatriate sportspeople in Armenia